The 10th congressional district of North Carolina is a congressional district in central and western North Carolina.  It currently includes all of Cleveland, Gaston, Lincoln, Polk, and Rutherford counties, and part of Catawba, Iredell, and Buncombe counties.

Republicans have won the district continuously since 1969. Republican Patrick McHenry has represented the district since 2005. The 10th district was part of the controversial statewide redistricting by the Republican-led state legislature in 2011. The district's northwest border was redrawn to include most of heavily Democratic Asheville, long the heart of the 11th district. At the same time, some heavily Republican areas in the 10th were shifted to the 11th.  While this made the 10th approximately seven points more Democratic, it was not nearly enough to overcome the heavy Republican tilt in the western Charlotte suburbs.
	
On February 23, 2022, the North Carolina Supreme Court approved a new map which changed the 10th district boundaries to include Alexander, Burke, Catawba, Iredell and Lincoln Counties, northwest Gaston County, eastern Rutherford County and a small section of southeastern Caldwell County. The current district is mostly exurban in character and is the most Republican district in North Carolina.

Counties 
Counties in the 2023-2025 district map.
 Alexander County
 Burke County
 Caldwell County (part)
 Catawba County
 Cleveland County
 Gaston County (part)
 Iredell County
 Lincoln County
 Rutherford County (part)

List of members representing the district

Recent election results

2012

2014

2016

2018

2020

2022

See also

 North Carolina's congressional districts
 List of United States congressional districts

Notes

References

Further reading

 Congressional Biographical Directory of the United States 1774–present

External links
 Political Graveyard database of North Carolina congressmen

10
Western North Carolina